Clupeichthys is a genus of sprats, herring-like fishes, that occur in rivers in Southeast Asia.  There are currently four recognized species in the genus.

Species
 Clupeichthys aesarnensis Wongratana, 1983 (Thai river sprat)
 Clupeichthys bleekeri (Hardenberg, 1936) (Kapuas river sprat)
 Clupeichthys goniognathus Bleeker, 1855 (Sumatran river sprat)
 Clupeichthys perakensis (Herre, 1936) (Perak river sprat)

References
 

Clupeidae
Freshwater fish genera
Taxa named by Pieter Bleeker